The Arplast Micro'B is a French ultralight aircraft that was designed and produced by propeller manufacturer Arplast Helice. It was supplied as a kit for amateur construction or as a complete ready-to-fly-aircraft.

Design and development
The Arplast Micro'B was designed to comply with the Fédération Aéronautique Internationale microlight rules, with a lightened version for the US FAR 103 Ultralight Vehicles category. It features a strut-braced high-wing, a single-seat enclosed cockpit, fixed tricycle landing gear and a single engine in tractor configuration.

The Micro'B is made from a combination of welded steel and carbon fibre, with the flying surfaces made from the latter material. Its  span wing is supported by a single strut per side and features automatic flaps. Standard engines included the  Rotax 447 two-stroke or other small lightweight motors,  mounted on the main keel tube above the cockpit.

Variants
Micro'B
Initial version, which was used to win the World Microlight Championships.
Micro'B ML
Improved version, with carbon fibre construction for the FAI Microlight class. Standard engine supplied was the  Rotax 447 two-stroke aircraft engine.
Micro'B 103
Lightened version for the US ultralight category, equipped with a  Briggs & Stratton V-twin engine.

Specifications (Micro'B 103)

References

External links
Photo of Arplast Micro'B

1990s French ultralight aircraft
Homebuilt aircraft
Light-sport aircraft
Single-engined tractor aircraft